"sakura" is the debut major single (second overall) of Japanese singer Saori@destiny, released on March 26, 2008, in Japan by D-topia Entertainment. The title track is a cover of Kyogo Kawaguchi's song of the same name. The single debuted and peaked at number 108 in the Oricon charts.

Track listing

Chart performance

References

2008 singles
2008 songs
Victor Entertainment singles